Benavent de la Conca is a locality located in the municipality of Isona i Conca Dellà, in Province of Lleida province, Catalonia, Spain. As of 2020, it has a population of 25.

Geography 
Benavent de la Conca is located 85km northeast of Lleida.

References

Populated places in the Province of Lleida